The Eastern Indo-Pacific is a biogeographic region of the Earth's seas, comprising the tropical waters around island groups in the central Pacific Ocean. It includes most of Polynesia, except for New Zealand and the Kermadec Islands. It also includes  the Marshall Islands and Kiribati from Micronesia. It adjoins the Central Indo-Pacific realm to the west, which encompasses Melanesia and the other island groups of Micronesia.

The Eastern Indo-Pacific is a marine realm, one of the great biogeographic divisions of the world's ocean basins.

Subdivisions
The Eastern Indo-Pacific marine realm is divided into six marine provinces. Three provinces are further divided into marine ecoregions.

 Hawaii province
 Hawaii
 Marshall, Gilbert, and Ellice Islands province
 Marshall Islands
 Gilbert and Ellice Islands
 Central Polynesia province
 Line Islands
 Phoenix Islands/Tokelau/Northern Cook Islands
 Samoan Islands
 Southeast Polynesia province
 Tuamotus
 Rapa-Pitcairn
 Southern Cook Islands/Austral Islands
 Society Islands
 Marquesas province
 Marquesas
 Easter Island province
 Easter Island

References

 
Marine realms
Pacific Ocean